Kenneth A. Clarke (or Ken Clarke) serves as the Executive Director for Rescue Village, a humane society located in Geauga County, Ohio.  He had previously served as the President and CEO of Pritzker Military Museum and Library in Chicago. He has also authored, published, edited and produced works as Kenneth Clarke and KC Clarke.

Early life 
Clarke's family has served in the military in every generation between the American Revolution and World War II, including Simeon Prior – something he credits with his interest in military history and the citizen soldier.

He earned his BA in English and Political Science from Taylor University in 1992. Following that, he studied for a MA in English at Miami University (1994).

Career 
Clarke has spent most of his career working in the non-profit spheres. He has served in some capacity at the Ohio Historical Society, John G Shedd Aquarium, Ohio State University, The Poetry Center at the School of the Art Institute and Safer Foundation.

While Clarke was at the Poetry Center, it began publishing its annual anthology Hands on Stanzas.

At Pritzker Military Museum and Library, Clarke first served as Vice President of Administration and Operations. He began producing and hosting episodes of Pritzker Military Presents and Citizen Soldier, the library's two web and television programs. He took over as the Museum's president and CEO in 2012.  While at the Pritzker Military Museum and Library he created, and was one of the architects of the World War One Centennial Commission's 100 Cities/100 Memorials matching grant program sponsored by the Pritzker Military Museum and Library that helped communities across the United States renovate World War One monuments.

Clarke joined Blockland Cleveland, a technology focused economic development initiative of JumpStart, Inc. and other Cleveland organizations in 2018.

Clarke joined Rescue Village, also known as the Geauga County Humane Society, in March of 2021. 

Clarke is a former board member of the USO of Illinois, and a former board member of National History Day.  Clarke is a member of Sons of the American Revolution.

Awards 
In 2003, Clarke received Columbia College’s Paul Berger Arts Entrepreneurship Award for "outstanding not-for-profit management".

In 2004, New City Chicago's Annual Lit50 list featured Clarke as #13 for producing "readings by Billy Corgan and Lucinda Williams and Miller Williams". The following year, he was placed at #23 for "securing The Poetry Center's archive at The University of Chicago Library".

Also in 2004, Mayor Richard M. Daley appointed Clarke to the advisory board of the City of Chicago Department of Cultural Affairs.

Publications and Exhibits 
Books

 The Poetry Center of Chicago Broadside Series, 2001 - 2005, Curator, Designer, Illustrator (on select broadsides) 
 Hands on Stanzas 2001-2002 Anthology of Poetry, 2002, Editor 
 Lawrence Ferlinghetti Live at The Poetry Center, 2002, Executive Director, Producer 
 Hands on Stanzas 2002-2003 Anthology of Poetry, 2003, Editor 
 Hands on Stanzas 2003-2004 Anthology of Poetry, 2004, Editor 
 reVerse, 2004, Various Artist, Director, Executive Producer, Producer 
 Hands on Stanzas 2004-2005 Anthology of Poetry, 2005, Editor 
 The Poetry Center of Chicago, When It Began, 2005, Author 
 On War: The Best Military Histories, 2013, Executive Editor 
 The History and Heritage of U.S. Navy SEALs, 2014, Executive Editor 
 Dignity of Duty: The Journals of Erasmus Corwin Gilbreath, 1861-1898, 2015, Executive Editor 
 The General: From Normandy to Dachau to Service in America, 2016, Executive Editor 
 Let We Forget: The Great War, 2018, Executive Editor and Creative Director 
 Zero to Hero: From Bullied Kid to Warrior, 2019, Executive Editor and Creative Director 
 Wolves and Flax: The Prior Family in the Cuyahoga Valley Wilderness, 2020, Author 

Exhibits

 SEAL: The Unspoken Sacrifice, 2013, Creative Director 
 Our Work: Modern Jobs - Ancient Origins, August 28, 2014 – April 24, 2016, Exhibit Feature 
 Dignity of Duty: A Personal Odyssey of Service from the Civil War to the Spanish-American War, 2015, Creative Director 
 Faces of War: Documenting the Vietnam War from the Front Lines, 2015, Creative Director  
 Hunting Charlie: Finding the Enemy in the Vietnam War, 2016, Creative Director   
 Lest We Forget: Sammies, Sailors and Doughboys Over There in World War I, 2018, Creative Director

Personal life 
Clarke lives in Ohio.

References

External links 

 

Living people
American television producers
Place of birth missing (living people)
Year of birth missing (living people)
Taylor University alumni
Miami University alumni
Museum directors